Jules de Balincourt (born 1972) is a French-born American contemporary artist, based in Brooklyn, New York. He is best known for his abstract, atmospheric paintings, with saturated colors, blurring the line between fantasy and reality.

Biography 
In 1972 de Balincourt was born in Paris and moved throughout his childhood but primarily growing up near the Malibou Lake area in the Santa Monica Mountains. He was educated in the San Francisco Bay Area at the California College of the Arts (CCA), receiving a B.F.A. in ceramics in 1998 and went on to study in New York City at the Hunter College graduating in 2005 with an M.F.A.

In 2006, de Balincourt founded the alternative art space Starr Space (formerly known as Starr Street Projects) in Brooklyn, New York.  Starr Space operated for three years and was used for diverse community programming, art events, yoga, weekly farmers market, rock shows, church parties and fundraisers, notable performances and performers such as  Ryan Trecartin, Terence Koh, Rita Ackermann, Mirror Mirror, the Slits, Lucky Dragons and Harmony Korine.

To create his paintings, he doesn't often work from photos or drawings. In his paintings he uses stencils, tape, knives and spray paint in the style of Outsider art.

Carol Lee called de Balincourt the "mayor of Bushwick" in an article for Paper.

Exhibitions 
His work has been exhibited at prominent international galleries and museums including Musee d’Art Moderne de la Ville de Paris and Palais de Tokyo in Paris, Mori Museum in Tokyo (solo) and has been featured in high-profile exhibitions including, “Greater New York” at the P.S.1 Contemporary Art Center and MOMA in New York, and “USA Today” at the Royal Academy in London.

His work is in prominent collections, including the Oppenheimer – JCCC Collection for the Nerman Museum of Contemporary Art, and the Saatchi Gallery, Brooklyn museum, LACMA.

References

External links
Jules de Balincourt's website
Jules de Balincourt on Re-Title.com sample of artwork

1972 births
20th-century French painters
20th-century French male artists
French male painters
French contemporary artists
21st-century French painters
21st-century French male artists
Hunter College alumni
Living people
Artists from New York (state)
California College of the Arts alumni
People from Bushwick, Brooklyn